The MCEM 3 was a proposed collapsible 9mm submachine gun designed by the British in 1947. It had a detachable stock alongside the magazine and a Lee–Enfield type bayonet. However the MCEM 3 was not accepted and found no customers.

References
Janes Military Review Fourth Year of Issue, Page 81, Published 4/1/1985

Submachine guns of the United Kingdom
9mm Parabellum submachine guns
Trial and research firearms of the United Kingdom